The 2004 Chicago Cubs season was the 133rd season of the Chicago Cubs franchise, the 129th in the National League and the 89th at Wrigley Field. The Cubs attempted to make a push for the National League pennant after their shocking end to 2003. The Cubs finished 89-73, good for 3rd in the NL Central. Despite the strong record, the Cubs faltered down the stretch and did not make the playoffs. The season is largely viewed as one of the most disappointing seasons in franchise history.

Offseason
 November 25, 2003: Derrek Lee was traded by the Florida Marlins to the Chicago Cubs for Hee-seop Choi and Mike Nannini (minors).
 December 2, 2003: Scott McClain was signed as a free agent with the Chicago Cubs.
 December 18, 2003: Todd Hollandsworth was signed as a free agent with the Chicago Cubs.
 March 23, 2004: Greg Maddux was signed as a free agent with the Chicago Cubs.

Regular season
In 2004, despite the return of Greg Maddux and a midseason deal for Nomar Garciaparra, misfortune struck the Cubs again. They led the Wild Card by 1.5 games over San Francisco and Houston on September 25, and both of those teams lost that day, giving the Northsiders a chance at increasing the lead to a commanding 2.5 games with only eight games remaining in the season, but reliever LaTroy Hawkins blew a save to the Mets, allowing a three-run game-tying home run with two outs in the ninth. The Cubs lost the game in extra innings, a defeat that seemingly deflated the team, as they proceeded to drop 6 of their last 8 games, including back-to-back 12 inning games to the lowly Cincinnati Reds at home, as the Astros won the Wild Card. Despite the fact that the Cubs had won 89 games, this fallout was decidedly unlovable, as the Cubs traded superstar Sammy Sosa after he had left the season's final game early.

Season standings

National League Central

Record vs. opponents

Transactions
April 1, 2004: Scott McClain was released by the Chicago Cubs.
April 3, 2004: Trenidad Hubbard was released by the Chicago Cubs.
April 12, 2004: Trenidad Hubbard was signed as a free agent with the Chicago Cubs.
June 7, 2004: Sam Fuld was drafted by the Chicago Cubs in the 10th round of the 2004 amateur draft. Player signed July 9, 2004.
July 30, 2004: Denny Hocking was signed as a free agent with the Chicago Cubs.
July 31, 2004: Alex Gonzalez was traded as part of a 4-team trade by the Chicago Cubs with Francis Beltrán and Brendan Harris to the Montreal Expos. The Boston Red Sox sent Nomar Garciaparra and Matt Murton to the Chicago Cubs. The Minnesota Twins sent Doug Mientkiewicz to the Boston Red Sox. The Montreal Expos sent Orlando Cabrera to the Boston Red Sox. The Chicago Cubs sent Justin Jones (minors) to the Minnesota Twins.

Roster

Player stats

Batting

Starters by position 
Note: Pos = Position; G = Games played; AB = At bats; H = Hits; Avg. = Batting average; HR = Home runs; RBI = Runs batted in

Other batters 
Note: G = Games played; AB = At bats; H = Hits; Avg. = Batting average; HR = Home runs; RBI = Runs batted in

Pitching

Starting pitchers 
Note: G = Games pitched; IP = Innings pitched; W = Wins; L = Losses; ERA = Earned run average; SO = Strikeouts

Other pitchers 
Note: G = Games pitched; IP = Innings pitched; W = Wins; L = Losses; ERA = Earned run average; SO = Strikeouts

Relief pitchers 
Note: G = Games pitched; W = Wins; L = Losses; SV = Saves; ERA = Earned run average; SO = Strikeouts

Farm system 

LEAGUE CHAMPIONS: Boise; LEAGUE CO-CHAMPIONS: Daytona

Notes

References
2004 Chicago Cubs season at Baseball Reference

Chicago Cubs seasons
Chicago Cubs season
Cub